Eric David Fingerhut (born May 6, 1959) is an American politician, attorney, and academic administrator, serving as the President and CEO of The Jewish Federations of North America (JFNA). Prior to his appointment at JFNA, he served as president and CEO of Hillel International from 2013 to 2019. Earlier, he served as the corporate Vice President of Education and STEM Learning business at Battelle Memorial Institute, Chancellor of the Ohio Board of Regents, Ohio state senator and member of the United States House of Representatives for one term.

Fingerhut was appointed Chancellor of the Ohio Board of Regents on March 14, 2007 by Governor Ted Strickland. This position is a member of the Ohio Governor's Cabinet. On February 22, 2011, he submitted his resignation to Gov. John Kasich, effective March 14, 2011, after serving four years of his five-year term. Chancellor Fingerhut earned a reputation as an innovative leader and ardent advocate of the value of higher education.

Early life and education 
Fingerhut grew up in the Cleveland, Ohio suburb of Cleveland Heights where he graduated from high school. He earned a Bachelor of Science degree from Northwestern University in 1981 and a Juris Doctor degree from Stanford University in 1984. He practiced law at Hahn Loeser & Parks LLP in Cleveland until becoming associate director of Cleveland Works, where he served from 1987 to 1989.

Career 

In 1989 Fingerhut served as the campaign manager for Michael R. White, then a candidate for Mayor of Cleveland. After the successful campaign, Fingerhut became the director of White's mayoral transition team.

Fingerhut served as member of the Ohio Senate from 1991 to 1993. In 1992, he was elected to the U.S. House of Representatives from Ohio's 19th congressional district and took office in 1993. In his re-election bid in 1994, however, Fingerhut was defeated by Lake County Prosecutor Steve LaTourette.

After losing his seat in Congress, Fingerhut easily won a seat again in the Ohio Senate, representing district 25. He served two full terms from 1999 through 2007, retiring due to term limits.

In 2004, Fingerhut was the Democratic nominee for the U.S. Senate seat of Republican George V. Voinovich, who was seeking a second term in that office after previous service as mayor of Cleveland and governor of Ohio. Both candidates were from the Cleveland area, but Fingerhut apparently could not dent Voinovich's longstanding popularity there and elsewhere in the state. Voinovich was handily re-elected, defeating Fingerhut 64%-36%.

Support for Israel 
While representing Ohio's 19th congressional district in the 103rd Congress, Fingerhut was the co-sponsor of four bills in support of Israel. Including:

H.R. 1407 confronted a boycott of the State of Israel by aiming "To prohibit government-to-government and commercial arms sales to any country that is participating in or cooperating with the boycott of Israel by Arab countries."H.R. 3656 unequivocally voiced its support for Israel seeking to "restrict sales and leases of defense articles and defense services to any country or international organization which as a matter of policy or practice is known to have sent letters to United States firms requesting compliance with, or soliciting information regarding compliance with, the secondary or tertiary Arab boycott."

Tenure at Hillel International 
Very quickly after beginning his tenure as CEO of Hillel International, the organization experienced a major controversy. The Hillel chapter at Swarthmore College declared itself an "Open Hillel," choosing to welcome all guest speakers and student organizations, whether or not they support Zionism. Fingerhut responded, stating "Let me be very clear – "anti-Zionists" will not be permitted to speak using the Hillel name or under the Hillel roof, under any circumstances." This controversy is widely seen as a key part of a broad conversation in the American Jewish community regarding whether or not Zionism is, or should be, a consensus issue.

Beginning in March 2015, Fingerhut was involved in a controversy with J Street U, the student arm of J Street. Fingerhut initially accepted an invitation to speak at the national student group meeting, but subsequently withdrew. Fingerhut then issued a statement saying he had withdrawn out of "concerns regarding my participation amongst other speakers who have made highly inflammatory statements against the Jewish state." Several people involved in US Jewish student life noted that in an era when the number of Jewish students engaging with Jewish and Israel-related campus groups is shrinking, it might be unproductive to alienate the 3,000 participants in the J Street conference, a population that included 40 Hillel professionals, and that Hillel donor pressure was the likely cause of Fingerhut's withdrawal. On March 23, 250 J Street students marched to Hillel headquarters, leaving letters for Fingerhut demanding a meeting with him and sharing their view that he caved to the demands of "more conservative donors instead of engaging with the full range of student voices — including those on the more liberal end." Fingerhut then wrote to Benjy Cannon, the board president of J Street U and a senior at the University of Maryland, to arrange a meeting between the students and members of Hillel International’s board of directors. In his letter, Fingerhut said that there was "work to do in the Jewish community at large to be one people that respects, honors and celebrates its diversity rather than fearing it. This incident taught me just how deep the divide is. I don’t yet have all the answers to how we will bridge this divide, but as Hillel’s president, I am committed to working with you to find them and I have no doubt we will be successful."

Personal life 
Eric Fingerhut is married to Amy Fingerhut and has two sons, Sam and Charlie. His parents are Samuel and Alice Fingerhut. He has been an active member in the Jewish community serving as a teacher and President of his synagogue.

Select Essays 

 Hillel is an open forum, in JTA
 Jewish students deserve a break from BDS, in the Times of Israel
 How Congress Can Fight Anti-Semitism and Violence, in the Wall Street Journal
 Ethiopian Aliyah - The Hope and The Promise, in the Times of Israel

See also
 List of United States representatives from Ohio
 List of Jewish members of the United States Congress

References

External links
 

 

1959 births
Politicians from Cleveland
Living people
Chancellors of the University System of Ohio
Democratic Party Ohio state senators
State cabinet secretaries of Ohio
Northwestern University alumni
Stanford Law School alumni
Democratic Party members of the United States House of Representatives from Ohio
Jewish members of the United States House of Representatives
American chief executives
21st-century American politicians
Politicians from Shaker Heights, Ohio
21st-century American Jews
Candidates in the 2004 United States elections